Ana Belén García Milán (born 3 November 1973), professionally known as Ana Milán, is a Spanish actress, model, journalist and writer. She is perhaps best known for her roles in the television series Camera Café, Yo soy Bea and Física o Química.

Early and personal life 
Milán was born Ana Belén García Milán on 3 November 1973 in Alicante, Comunidad Valenciana. As a child, she lived in Almansa (Albacete) and she wanted to become an astronaut. Milán accomplished journalism studies and worked for newspapers Tribuna and La Guia de Ocio. She shares a close friendship with actress Nuria González. Her favourite film is Love Actually. Milán began her career as a model.

Milán has a son named Marco, born in 2002, from a relationship with actor Paco Morales. She and Morales split in 2007, after six years of dating. Milán was then engaged to basketball player Juan Antonio Corbalán, but they announced their split in 2008.

Filmography

Awards and nominations

References

External links 
 Official Website
 

1973 births
Living people
People from Alicante
Spanish actresses
Spanish female models
Spanish film actresses
Spanish stage actresses
Spanish television actresses